Dangerous Curves is a 1988 American comedy film directed by David Lewis and starring Tate Donovan and Grant Heslov.

The movie also featured brief appearances by Debbe Dunning and Cynthia Geary, early in their respective careers.  Both actresses were cast as participants in a bikini contest.

Plot
Chuck (Tate Donovan), an uptight college student in Los Angeles, is hired by a successful businessman to deliver a Porsche to his daughter in Lake Tahoe, with the promise of a job if the delivery is successful.  His fun-loving, girl-obsessed friend and roommate, Wally (Grant Heslov) convinces Chuck to drive him to San Diego first.  The Porsche is stolen, and Chuck decides to try to get it back with Wally's help but without involving the police so that the businessman does not find out.  Meanwhile, Shawn (Karen Lynn Scott), a fun-loving Texan, has convinced her naive friend Michelle (Danielle von Zerneck) to participate in a beauty pageant.  The car thief is a successful local businessman, Greg Krevske (Leslie Nielsen), who pledges the stolen Porsche as part of the grand prize in the contest; Chuck and Wally meet Shawn and Michelle, who are initially skeptical of the boys' story.  Rival pageant contestant Blake (Valerie Breiman) has a controlling stage mother who tricks Shawn and Michelle into going to a party on Krevske's boat to try to get them out of the way for the next round of the pageant so that they will be disqualified.  Chuck and Wally sneak onto the boat in order to get evidence of the theft.  Chuck finds a briefcase full of incriminating evidence, including the Porsche's original license plate.  The four flee on WetBikes, steal Krevske's Ferrari, and agree to work together to steal back the Porsche.  Chuck and Michelle spend the night together on a catamaran on the beach.  The next day, with Michelle's help, Chuck and Wally steal back the Porsche.  They present Krevske's Ferrari to the pageant as a replacement grand prize, and give the police the incriminating evidence from Krevske's boat.  Wally suggests leaving in order to make it to Lake Tahoe on time, but Chuck refuses to leave without talking to Michelle again.  Blake wins the beauty pageant, Shawn invites Wally to stay in San Diego with her to have fun, and Chuck and Michelle get ready to drive to Lake Tahoe.

Cast
Tate Donovan as Chuck Upton
Danielle von Zerneck as Michelle West
Grant Heslov as Wally Wilder 
Valerie Breiman as Blake 
Robert Stack as Louis Faciano 
Leslie Nielsen as Greg Krevske
Karen Lynn Scott as Shawn
Michael Rosenberg as Jackie Diamond
Elizabeth Ashley as Miss Reed
Robert Romanus as Hector 
Eva LaRue as Leslie Cruz
Martha Quinn as Tympani Charles
Robert Klein as Bam Bam

Production

Reception

References

External links

 Images from the film, with commentary, focusing on Debbe Dunning

1988 films
1980s English-language films
1980s sex comedy films
American sex comedy films
Vestron Pictures films
Films about beauty pageants
Films shot in San Diego
Teen sex comedy films
1988 comedy films
1980s American films
Films set in San Diego